The following were volleyball-related events during 2019 throughout the world.

Beach volleyball

World and continental beach volleyball events
 June 18–23: 2019 FIVB Beach Volleyball U21 World Championships in  Udon Thani
 Winners:  (Renato Andrew Lima de Carvalho & Rafael Andrew Lima de Carvalho) (m) /  (Victoria Lopes Pereira Tosta & Vitoria De Souza Rodrigues) (f)
 June 28 – July 7: 2019 Beach Volleyball World Championships in  Hamburg
 Winners:  (Oleg Stoyanovskiy & Viacheslav Krasilnikov) (m) /  (Sarah Pavan & Melissa Humana-Paredes) (f)
 September 4–8: 2019 FIVB Beach Volleyball World Tour Finals in  Rome
 Winners:  (Oleg Stoyanovskiy & Viacheslav Krasilnikov) (m) /  (Laura Ludwig & Margareta Kozuch) (f)
 September 18–22: 2019 FIVB Beach Volleyball Olympic Qualification Tournament in  Haiyang
 Men:  and  both qualified to compete at the 2020 Summer Olympics.
 Women:  and  both qualified to compete at the 2020 Summer Olympics.

2019 FIVB Beach Volleyball World Tour
 January 2 – September 8: 2019 FIVB Beach Volleyball World Tour

2019 World Tour Five Star BV events
 July 9–14: Five Star No. 1 in  Gstaad
 Winners:  (Anders Mol & Christian Sørum) (m) /  (April Ross & Alexandra Klineman) (f)
 July 31 – August 4: Five Star No. 2 (final) in  Vienna
 Winners:  (Anders Mol & Christian Sørum) (m) /  (Sarah Pavan & Melissa Humana-Paredes) (f)

2019 World Tour Four Star BV events
 January 2–6: Four Star No. 1 in  The Hague
 Winners:  (Viacheslav Krasilnikov & Oleg Stoyanovskiy) (m) /  (Ana Patricia Silva Ramos & Rebecca Cavalcanti Barbosa Silva) (f)
 March 11–16: Four Star No. 2 in  Doha (men only)
 Winners:  (Marco Grimalt & Esteban Grimalt)
 April 24–28: Four Star No. 3 in  Xiamen
 Winners:  (Viacheslav Krasilnikov & Oleg Stoyanovskiy) (m) /  (Ana Patricia Silva Ramos & Rebecca Cavalcanti Barbosa Silva) (f)
 May 15–19: Four Star #4 in  Itapema
 Winners:  (Anders Mol & Christian Sørum) (m) /  (Alexandra Klineman & April Ross) (f)
 May 22–26: Four Star No. 5 in  Jinjiang, Fujian
 Winners:  (Anders Mol & Christian Sørum) (m) /  (Kerri Walsh Jennings & Brooke Sweat) (f)
 May 29 – June 2: Four Star No. 6 in  Ostrava
 Winners:  (Anders Mol & Christian Sørum) (m) /  (Ágatha Bednarczuk & Eduarda Santos Lisboa) (f)
 June 12–16: Four Star No. 7 in  Warsaw
 Winners:  (Evandro Oliveira & Bruno Oscar Schmidt) (m) /  (Mariafe Artacho del Solar & Taliqua Clancy) (f)
 July 17–21: Four Star No. 8 in  Espinho
 Winners:  (Alison Cerutti & Álvaro Morais Filho) (m) /  (Nadezda Makroguzova & Svetlana Kholomina) (f)
 July 24–28: Four Star No. 9 in  Tokyo
 Winners:  (Anders Mol & Christian Sørum) (m) /  (Ágatha Bednarczuk & Eduarda Santos Lisboa) (f)
 August 14–18: Four Star #10 in  Moscow
 Winners:  (Aleksandrs Samoilovs & Jānis Šmēdiņš) (m) /  (Anouk Vergé-Dépré & Joana Heidrich) (f)
 November 13–17: Four Star No. 11 in  Chetumal

2019 World Tour Three Star BV events
 March 6–10: Three Star No. 1 in  Sydney
 Winners:  (Marco Grimalt & Esteban Grimalt) (m) /  (Becchara Palmer & Nicole Laird) (f)
 April 30 – May 4: Three Star No. 2 in  Kuala Lumpur
 Winners:  (Alison Cerutti & Álvaro Morais Filho) (m) /  (Barbora Hermannová & Markéta Sluková) (f)
 July 17–21: Three Star No. 3 in  Edmonton
 Winners:  (Nico Beeler & Marco Krattiger) (m) /  (Sarah Pavan & Melissa Humana-Paredes) (f)
 August 22–25: Three Star No. 4 in  Jūrmala (men only)
 Winners:  (Aleksandrs Samoilovs & Jānis Šmēdiņš)
 October 30 – November 3: Three Star No. 5 in  Qinzhou
 Winners:  (Adrian Heidrich & Mirco Gerson) (m) /  (Karla Borger & Julia Sude) (f)

2019 World Tour Two Star BV events
 February 21–24: Two Star No. 1 in  Phnom Penh (women only)
 Winners:  (Peny Karagkouni & Vassiliki Arvaniti)
 March 21–24: Two Star No. 2 in  Siem Reap (men only)
 Winners:  (Christoph Dressler & Alexander Huber)
 May 15–19: Two Star No. 3 in  Aydın
 Winners:  (Maciej Rudol & Jakub Szalankiewicz) (m) /  (Maria Voronina & Mariia Bocharova) (f)
 May 30 – June 2: Two Star No. 4 in  Nantong (women only)
 Winners:  (WEN Shuhui & WANG Jingzhe)
 June 5–9: Two Star #5 in  Nanjing (women only)
 Winners:  (WEN Shuhui & WANG Jingzhe)
 July 4–7: Two Star #6 in  Qidong, Jiangsu
 Winners:  (Christoph Dressler & Alexander Huber) (m) /  (WEN Shuhui & WANG Jingzhe)
 August 22–25: Two Star #7 in  Zhongwei (women only)
 Winners:  (WEN Shuhui & WANG Jingzhe)

2019 World Tour One Star BV events
 February 28 – March 3: One Star #1 in  Visakhapatnam
 Winners:  (Armin Dollinger & Simon Kulzer) (m) /  (Martina Bonnerová & Martina Maixnerova) (f)
 March 7–10: One Star #2 in  Kg Speu (men only)
 Winners:  (Maxim Sivolap & Artem Yarzutkin)
 April 4–7: One Star #3 in  Battambang (women only)
 Winners:  (Lara Dykstra & Cassie House)
 April 8–11: One Star #4 in  Satun
 Winners:  (Denys Denysenko & Vladyslav Iemelianchyk) (m) /  (Kou Nai-han & LIU Pi-hsin) (f)
 April 11–14: One Star No. 5 in  Langkawi
 Winners:  (Daniil Kuvichka & Anton Kislytsyn) (m) /  (Lara Dykstra & Cassie House) (f)
 April 18–21: One Star #6 in  Gothenburg
 Winners:  (Aliaksandr Dziadkou & Pavel Piatrushka) (m) /  (Emi van Driel & Raïsa Schoon) (f)
 May 9–12: One Star #7 in  Tuần Châu (women only)
 Winners:  (Ksenia Dabizha & Daria Rudykh)
 May 23–26: One Star #8 in  Boracay
 Winners:  (Banlue Nakprakhong & Narongdet Kangkon) (m) /  (Satono Ishitsubo & Asami Shiba) (f)
 June 6–10: One Star #9 in  Baden
 Winners:  (Clemens Doppler & Alexander Horst) (m) /  (Katharina Schützenhöfer & Lena Plesiutschnig) (f)
 June 14–16: One Star No. 10 in  Ios
 Winners:  (Florian Gosselin & Jérémy Silvestre) (m) /  (Konstantina Tsopoulou & Dimitra Manavi) (f)
 July 11–14: One Star #11 in  Daegu (women only)
 Winners:  (Alexandra Moiseeva & Ekaterina Syrtseva)
 July 12–14: One Star No. 12 in  Alba Adriatica (women only)
 Winners:  (Emi van Driel & Raïsa Schoon)
 July 18–21: One Star #13 in  Ulsan (women only)
 Event cancelled.
 July 25–28: One Star No. 14 in  Pinarella Di Cervia (men only)
 Winners:  (Maksim Hudyakov & Igor Velichko)
 August 1–4: One Star #15 in  Ljubljana
 Winners:  (Tadej Bozenk & Vid Jakopin) (m) /  (Inna Makhno & Iryna Makhno) (f)
 August 1–4: One Star #16 in  Malbork (men only)
 Winners:  (Michal Kadziola & Marcin Ociepski)
 August 7–11: One Star #17 in  Vaduz
 Winners:  (Moritz Fabian Kindl & Mathias Seiser) (m) /  (Emma Piersma & Pleun Ypma) (f)
 August 8–11: One Star #18 in  Miguel Pereira
 Winners:  (Renato Andrew Lima de Carvalho & Rafael Andrew Lima de Carvalho) (m) /  (Diana Bellas Romariz Silva & Andressa Cavalcanti Ramalho) (f)
 August 8–11: One Star #19 in  Budapest
 Winners:  (Samuele Cottafava & Jakob Windisch) (m) /  (Chiyo Suzuki & Yurika Sakaguchi) (f)
 August 15–18: One Star #20 in  Knokke-Heist
 Winners:  (Jérémy Silvestre & Timothée Platre) (m) /  (Galindo Andrea & Galindo Claudia) (f)
 August 21–24: One Star #21 in  Rubavu District
 Winners:  (Kensuke Shoji & Masato Kurasaka) (m) /  (Iris Reinders & Mexime van Driel) (f)
 August 24–27: One Star #22 in  Salalah (men only)
 Winners:  (Daniel Thomsen & Morten Overgaard)
 August 27–31: One Star #23 in  Montpellier (men only)
 Winners:  (Dirk Boehlé & Stefan Boermans)
 August 28 – September 1: One Star #24 in  Oslo (men only)
 Winners:  (Anders Mol & Nils Gunnar Ringøen)
 October 1–4: One Star No. 25 in  Bandar Torkaman (men only)
 Winners:  (Nuttanon Inkiew & Sedtawat Padsawud)
 November 6–9: One Star #26 in  Tel Aviv
 Winners:  (Samuele Cottafava & Jakob Windisch) (m) /  (Kaho Sakaguchi & Reika Murakami) (f)
 November 12–15: Aspire Beach Volleyball Cup (One Star #27) in  Doha

Volleyball

FIVB World Championships
 July 12–21: 2019 FIVB Volleyball Women's U20 World Championship in  León, Guanajuato & Aguascalientes City
  defeated , 3–2 in matches played, to win their first FIVB Volleyball Women's U20 World Championship title.
  took third place.
 July 18–27: 2019 FIVB Volleyball Men's U21 World Championship in  Manama
  defeated , 3–2 in matches played, to win their first FIVB Volleyball Men's U21 World Championship title.
  took third place.
 August 21–30: 2019 FIVB Volleyball Boys' U19 World Championship in  Tunis
  defeated , 3–1 in matches played, to win their second FIVB Volleyball Boys' U19 World Championship title.
  took third place.
 September 5–14: 2019 FIVB Volleyball Girls' U18 World Championship in  Cairo
  defeated , 3–2 in matches played, to win their first FIVB Volleyball Girls' U18 World Championship title.
  took third place.
 December 3–8: 2019 FIVB Volleyball Men's Club World Championship in  Betim
 December 3–8: 2019 FIVB Volleyball Women's Club World Championship in  Shaoxing

FIVB World and Challenger Cups
 June 26–30: 2019 FIVB Volleyball Women's Challenger Cup in  Lima
  took third place.
 Note: Canada has qualified to compete at the 2020 FIVB Volleyball Women's Nations League.
 July 3–7: 2019 FIVB Volleyball Men's Challenger Cup in  Ljubljana
  defeated , 3–0 in matches played, to win their first FIVB Volleyball Men's Challenger Cup title.
  took third place.
 Note: Slovenia has qualified to compete at the 2020 FIVB Volleyball Men's Nations League.
 September 14–29: 2019 FIVB Volleyball Women's World Cup in 
 Champions: ; Second: ; Third: 
 October 1–15: 2019 FIVB Volleyball Men's World Cup in 
 Champions: ; Second: ; Third:

FIVB Nations League
 May 21 – June 20: 2019 FIVB Volleyball Women's Nations League
 July 3–7: Women's VNL Finals in  Nanjing
 The  defeated , 3–2 in matches played, to win their second consecutive FIVB Volleyball Women's Nations League title.
  took third place.
 May 31 – June 30: 2019 FIVB Volleyball Men's Nations League
 July 10–14: Men's VNL Finals in  Chicago
  took third place.

NORCECA
 January 4–6: 2019 Women's NORCECA Caribbean Series in  San Juan (debut event)
 Winners: ; Runner-up: 
 August 31 – September 8: 2019 Men's NORCECA Volleyball Championship in  Winnipeg
  took third place.
 October 6–14: 2019 Women's NORCECA Volleyball Championship in  San Juan
  took third place.

CSV
National teams
 August 28 – September 1: 2019 Women's South American Volleyball Championship in  Lima
  defeated , 3–0 in matches played, to win their 13th consecutive and 21st overall Women's South American Volleyball Championship title.
  took third place.
 September 10–14: 2019 Men's South American Volleyball Championship in  Santiago
  defeated , 3–2 in matches played, to win their 27th consecutive and 32nd overall Men's South American Volleyball Championship title.
  took third place.  took fourth place.
  took fifth place.  took sixth place.
 Note 1: Brazil and Argentina both qualified to compete at the 2020 Summer Olympics.
 Note 2: The other four teams here have qualified to compete at the 2020 South American Olympic Qualification Tournament.
 October 24–28: 2019 Girls' U16 South American Volleyball Championship in  Lima
 Champions: ; Second: ; Third: ; Fourth: ; Fifth: 

Club teams
 September 29, 2018 – February 13: 2018–19 Copa Libertadores (finals in  Taubaté)
 In the final,  Bolívar Volley defeated  SESC-RJ, 3–0, to win their 1st title.
  SESI-SP took third place and  Funvic Taubaté took fourth place.
 February 19–23: 2019 Women's South American Volleyball Club Championship in  Belo Horizonte
  Minas Tênis Clube defeated fellow Brazilian team, Dentil Praia, 3–0 in matches played, to win their second consecutive and fourth overall Women's South American Volleyball Club Championship title.
  San Lorenzo de Almagro (Vòley Femenino) took third place.
 Note: Minas Tênis Clube has qualified to compete at the 2019 FIVB Volleyball Women's Club World Championship.
 February 26 – March 2: 2019 Men's South American Volleyball Club Championship in  Belo Horizonte
  Sada Cruzeiro defeated  UPCN San Juan, 3–1 in matches played, to win their fourth consecutive and sixth overall Men's South American Volleyball Club Championship title.
  Club Obras Sanitarias took third place.
 Note: Sada Cruzeiro has qualified to compete at the 2019 FIVB Volleyball Men's Club World Championship.

2019 Pan-American Volleyball Cup events

 April 24–29: 2019 Boys' Youth Pan-American Volleyball Cup in  Santo Domingo
  defeated , 3–0 in matches played, to win their first Boys' Youth Pan-American Volleyball Cup title.
 The  took third place.
 Note: All teams mentioned here have qualified to compete at the 2019 FIVB Volleyball Boys' U19 World Championship.
 May 2–12: 2019 Men's Junior Pan-American Volleyball Cup in  Tarapoto
  defeated , 3–0 in matches played, to win their first Men's Junior Pan-American Volleyball Cup title.
  took third place.
 Note 1: Puerto Rico has qualified to compete at the 2019 FIVB Volleyball Men's U21 World Championship.
 Note 2: By rankings alone, Canada has qualified to compete at the 2019 FIVB Volleyball Men's U21 World Championship.
 Note 3: Cuba has already qualified to compete at the 2019 FIVB Volleyball Men's U21 World Championship, from winning the 2018 NORCECA Championship.
 May 11–19: 2019 Women's Junior Pan-American Volleyball Cup in  Lima
  took third place.
 Note 1: Cuba has qualified to compete at the 2019 FIVB Volleyball Women's U20 World Championship.
 Note 2: Both the Dominican Republic and Peru have qualified to compete at the 2019 FIVB Volleyball Women's U20 World Championship because of their world team rankings.
 May 19–27: 2019 Girls' Youth Pan-American Volleyball Cup in  Durango City
  defeated , 3–0 in matches played, to win their first Girls' Youth Pan-American Volleyball Cup title.
  took third place.
 Note 1: Both Puerto Rico and Mexico qualified to compete at the 2019 FIVB Volleyball Girls' U18 World Championship.
 Note 2: Peru has already qualified to compete at the 2019 FIVB Volleyball Girls' U18 World Championship because of their second place finish at the 2018 Girls' Youth South American Volleyball Championship.
 June 14–22: 2019 Men's Pan-American Volleyball Cup in  Colima City
  defeated , 3–2 in matches played, to win their third Men's Pan-American Volleyball Cup title.
  took third place.
 July 4–14: 2019 Women's Pan-American Volleyball Cup in  Trujillo & Chiclayo
  took third place.

CEV

National teams
 May 25 – June 22: 2019 Women's European Volleyball League in 
 The  defeated , 3–1 in matches played, to win their second Women's European Volleyball League title.
  took third place.
 Note: The Czech Republic and Croatia both qualified to compete at the 2019 FIVB Volleyball Women's Challenger Cup.
 May 25 – June 23: 2019 Men's European Volleyball League in 
  defeated , 3–0 in matches played, to win their first Men's European Volleyball League title.
 The  took third place.
 Note: Turkey and Belarus both qualified to compete at the 2019 FIVB Volleyball Men's Challenger Cup.
  defeated , 3–2 in matches played, to win their second consecutive and third overall Women's European Volleyball Championship title.
  took third place.
  defeated , 3–1 in matches played, to win their third Men's European Volleyball Championship title.
  took third place.

Club teams
 October 9, 2018 – May 18, 2019: 2018–19 CEV Women's Champions League
  Igor Gorgonzola Novara defeated fellow Italian team, Imoco Volley Conegliano, 3–1 in matches played, to win their first CEV Women's Champions League title. 
 October 9, 2018 – May 19, 2019: 2018–19 CEV Champions League
  Cucine Lube Civitanova defeated  VC Zenit-Kazan, 3–1 in matches played, to win their second CEV Champions League title.
 November 6, 2018 – March 26, 2019: 2018–19 Men's CEV Cup
  Diatec Trentino defeated  Galatasaray İstanbul, 6–2 in matches played over 2 legs, to win their first Men's CEV Cup title.
 November 6, 2018 – March 26, 2019: 2018–19 Women's CEV Cup
  Unet E-Work Busto Arsizio defeated  CSM Volei Alba Blaj, 6–1 in matches played over 2 legs, to win their third Women's CEV Cup title.
 November 6, 2018 – March 27, 2019: 2018–19 CEV Challenge Cup
  Belogorie Belgorod defeated  Vero Volley Monza, 5–3 in matches played over 2 legs, to win their first CEV Challenge Cup title.
 November 6, 2018 – March 27, 2019: 2018–19 CEV Women's Challenge Cup
  Saugella Team Monza defeated  Aydin BBSK, 6–1 in matches played over 2 legs, to win their first CEV Women's Challenge Cup title.

League events
 September 27, 2018 – March 10, 2019: 2018–19 Women's MEVZA Cup (final four at  Olomouc)
  VK UP Olomouc defeated  OK Nova KBM Branik, 3–1 in matches played, to win their first Women's MEVZA Cup title.
 September 29, 2018 – March 2, 2019: 2018–19 Baltic Men Volleyball League (final four at  Tartu)
  Bigbank Tartu defeated fellow Estonian team, Saaremaa, 3–2 in matches played, to win their third Baltic Men Volleyball League title. 
  Pärnu took third place.
 September 30, 2018 – March 16, 2019: 2018–19 MEVZA Cup (final four at  Bleiburg)
  ACH Volley Ljubljana defeated  Posojilnica Aich/Dob, 3–0 in matches played, to win their fifth MEVZA Cup title.
  Calcit Volley Kamnik took third place.
 October 6, 2018 – March 17, 2019: 2018–19 Women's Balti Liiga
  Alytus defeated  Tartu Ülikool, 3–2 in matches played, in the final.
  Riga VS took third place.
 February 8–10: NEVZA Club Championships in  Ishøj
 Men: 1st.  Polonia London, 2nd.  BK Marienlyst, 3rd.  Hvidovre VK, 4th.  Randaberg VK
 Women: 1st.  Engelholm VS, 2nd.  ToppVolley Norge, 3rd.  Brøndby VK, 4th.  Oslo Volley

AVC
National teams
 July 13–21: 2019 Asian Women's U23 Volleyball Championship in  Hanoi
  defeated , 3–0 in matches played, to win their second Asian Women's U23 Volleyball Championship title.
  took third place.
 August 3–11: 2019 Asian Men's U23 Volleyball Championship in  Naypyidaw
  defeated , 3–1 in matches played, to win their first Asian Men's U23 Volleyball Championship title.
  took third place.
 August 18–25: 2019 Asian Women's Volleyball Championship in  Seoul
  defeated , 3–1 in matches played, to win their second consecutive and fifth overall Asian Women's Volleyball Championship title.
  took third place.
 September 13–21: 2019 Asian Men's Volleyball Championship in  Tehran
  defeated , 3–0 in matches played, to win their third Asian Men's Volleyball Championship title.
  took third place.

Club teams
 April 18–26: 2019 Asian Men's Club Volleyball Championship in  Taipei
  Shahrdari Varamin VC defeated  Panasonic Panthers, 3–2 in matches played, to win their second Asian Men's Club Volleyball Championship title.
  Al Rayyan took third place.
 Note: Shahrdari Varamin has qualified to compete at the 2019 FIVB Volleyball Men's Club World Championship.
 April 27 – May 5: 2019 Asian Women's Club Volleyball Championship in  Tianjin
  Tianjin Bohaibank defeated  Generali Supreme Chonburi-E.Tech, 3–1 in matches played, in the final.
  Hisamitsu Springs took third place.
 Note: Tianjin Bohaibank has qualified to compete at the 2020 FIVB Volleyball Women's Club World Championship.

AVA
 January 27 – February 4: 2019 Women's Arab volleyball clubs championship in  Cairo
 In the final,  CS Sfaxien defeated  Al Ahly, 3–0, to win their 1st title.
 February 15–23: 2019 Arab Clubs Championship  Tunis
 In the final,  Al Rayyan SC defeated  ES Tunis, 3–2, to win their 2nd title.
  Police SC Qatar took third place and  MC Alger took fourth place.

CAVB
National teams
 July 5–15: 2019 Women's African Volleyball Championship in  Cairo
  defeated , 3–2 in matches played, to win their second consecutive Women's African Volleyball Championship title.
  took third place.
 July 19–29: 2019 Men's African Volleyball Championship in  Tunis
  defeated , 3–2 in matches played, to win their second consecutive and tenth overall Men's African Volleyball Championship title.
  took third place.
 Note: Tunisia has qualified to compete at the 2020 FIVB Volleyball Men's Challenger Cup.

Club teams
 March 16–25: 2019 Women's African Clubs Championship in  Cairo
  Al Ahly defeated  Carthage, 3–1 in matches played, to win their second consecutive and tenth overall Women's African Volleyball Clubs Championship title.
  Kenya Pipelines took third place.
 April 1–10: 2019 African Clubs Championship in  Cairo
  Al Ahly defeated fellow Egyptian team, Smouha SC, 3–0 in matches played, to win their third consecutive and 14th overall African Clubs Championship title.
  Ahli Tripoli took third place.

References

External links
 FIVB – Fédération Internationale de Volleyball (International Volleyball Federation)

 
 
Volleyball by year
2019 sport-related lists